Aladagh Rural District is a rural district (dehestan) in the Central District of Bojnord County, North Khorasan Province, Iran. At the 2006 census, its population was 26,259, in 6,408 families.  The rural district has 40 villages. It takes its name from the Aladagh Mountains  - the name of which comes from Turkish Ala dağ, meaning 'variegated / speckled mountain (range)'.

References 

Rural Districts of North Khorasan Province
Bojnord County